The Italy and South Africa rugby union teams first met in 1995. Their 101-0 victory in Durban in 1999 was at the time the Springboks' largest victory, and remains Italy's heaviest defeat. Italy earned their first ever win over South Africa on 19 November 2016, 20-18, in Florence.

Summary

Overall

Record
Note: Date shown in brackets indicates when the record was or last set.

Results

List of series

References	

Italy national rugby union team matches
South Africa national rugby union team matches